A riff is a repeated chord progression or refrain in music (also known as an ostinato figure in classical music); it is a pattern, or melody, often played by the rhythm section instruments or solo instrument, that forms the basis or accompaniment of a musical composition. Though riffs are most often found in rock music, heavy metal music, Latin, funk, and jazz, classical music is also sometimes based on a riff, such as Ravel's Boléro. Riffs can be as simple as a tenor saxophone honking a simple, catchy rhythmic figure, or as complex as the riff-based variations in the head arrangements played by the Count Basie Orchestra.

David Brackett (1999) defines riffs as "short melodic phrases", while Richard Middleton (1999) defines them as "short rhythmic, melodic, or harmonic figures repeated to form a structural framework". Rikky Rooksby states: "A riff is a short, repeated, memorable musical phrase, often pitched low on the guitar, which focuses much of the energy and excitement of a rock song."

BBC Radio 2, in compiling its list of 100 Greatest Guitar Riffs, defined a riff as the "main hook of a song", often beginning the song, and is "repeated throughout it, giving the song its distinctive voice".

Use of the term has extended to comedy, where riffing means the verbal exploration of a particular subject, thus moving the meaning away from the original jazz sense of a repeated figure that a soloist improvises over, to instead indicate the improvisation itself—improvising on a melody or progression as one would improvise on a subject by extending a singular thought, idea or inspiration into a bit, or routine.

Etymology 

The term riff entered musical slang in the 1920s (Rooksby, ibid, p. 6) and is used primarily in discussion of forms of rock music or jazz. "Most rock musicians use riff as a near-synonym for musical idea" (Middleton 1990, p. 125).

The etymology of the term is not clearly known. Some sources explain riff as an abbreviation for "rhythmic figure" or "refrain".

Usage in jazz, blues and R&B 

In jazz, blues and R&B, riffs are often used as the starting point for longer compositions. Charlie Parker used riff on "Now's the Time". Blues guitarist John Lee Hooker used riff on "Boogie Chillen" in  1948.

The riff from Charlie Parker's bebop number "Now's the Time" (1945) re-emerged four years later as the R&B dance hit "The Hucklebuck". The verse of "The Hucklebuck", which was another riff, was "borrowed" from the Artie Matthews composition "Weary Blues". Glenn Miller's "In the Mood" had an earlier life as Wingy Manone's "Tar Paper Stomp". All these songs use twelve-bar blues riffs, and most of these riffs probably precede the examples given (Covach 2005, p. 71).

In classical music, individual musical phrases used as the basis of classical music pieces are called ostinatos or simply phrases. Contemporary jazz writers also use riff- or lick-like ostinatos in modal music and Latin jazz.

Riff-driven 

The term "riff-driven" is used to describe a piece of music that relies on a repeated instrumental riff as the basis of its most prominent melody, cadence, or (in some cases) leitmotif. Riff-driven songs are largely a product of jazz, blues, and post-blues era music (rock and pop). The musical goal of riff-driven songs is akin to the classical continuo effect, but raised to much higher importance (in fact, the repeated riff is used to anchor the song in the ears of the listener). The riff/continuo is brought to the forefront of the musical piece and often is the primary melody that remains in the listener's ears. A call and response often holds the song together, creating a "circular" rather than linear feel.

A few examples of riff-driven songs are "Whole Lotta Love" and "Black Dog" by Led Zeppelin, "Day Tripper" by The Beatles, "Brown Sugar" and "(I Can't Get No) Satisfaction" by The Rolling Stones, "Smoke on the Water" by Deep Purple, "Back in Black" by AC/DC, "Smells Like Teen Spirit" by Nirvana, "Johnny B Goode" by Chuck Berry, "Back in the Saddle" by Aerosmith, and "You Really Got Me" by The Kinks.

See also 

Fill
Hook
Lick
Riffusion
Vamp

References

Sources 
 Covach, John. "Form in Rock Music: A Primer", in Stein, Deborah (2005). Engaging Music: Essays in Music Analysis. New York: Oxford University Press. .

External links
Jazz Guitar Riffs

Accompaniment
Formal sections in music analysis